Butler Creek is a stream in northwestern Benton County, Arkansas and southwestern McDonald County, Missouri. It is a tributary of the Elk River.

The stream flows west northwest past Sulphur Springs and turns to the north as it enters Missouri.

Butler Creek has the name of Charles Butler, a pioneer citizen.

See also
List of rivers of Arkansas
List of rivers of Missouri

References

Rivers of Benton County, Arkansas
Rivers of McDonald County, Missouri
Rivers of Arkansas
Rivers of Missouri